Legend of a Fighter (in Chinese 霍元甲) is a 1982 Hong Kong martial arts film directed by Yuen Woo-ping, and produced by Ng See-yuen, who also wrote the screenplay with Leung Lap-yan and Wong Jing. The film stars Bryan Leung, Yasuaki Kurata, Yuen Yat-choh, Philip Ko, Yuen Cheung-yan, Brandy Yuen and Steve Lee. The film is based on the story of Chinese martial artist Huo Yuanjia (Cantonese: Fok Yuen-kap 霍元甲).

Plot
Bryan Leung is portrayed as the historical figure Fok Yuen-kap in this action film. As the fourth of Fok Yan-tai's children Fok Yuen-kap was born weak and susceptible to illness. Fok Yuen-kap had asthma at an early age and contracted jaundice; his father discouraged him from learning martial arts.

His Father hires Kong Ho-san (Yasuaki Kurata), a tutor from Japan, to teach his son academics and moral values. But Kong secretly learns the Fok family's style of martial arts, mizongyi. Fok wants to learn martial arts against his father's wishes.  He observes his father teaching his students martial arts during the day and secretly practices at night with Kong.  After some time, Kong leaves Fok and advises him to practice Martial Arts.

Fok grows up and is challenged by a Japanese Fighter Sanaka. Fok defeats Sanaka and his Japanese swordsman. Sanaka commits suicide because of the defeat and his father sends the Top fighter from Japan to challenge Fok in China.

It is revealed that Kong Ho-san is the Japanese Fighter with whom Fok is supposed to fight with. Kong willing his student (Fok) to do his best, imposters as that he hates Fok Yuen-kap and all the Chinese people. At the end it is revealed after Fok Yuen-kap defeats Kong Ho-san.

Cast
 Bryan Leung as Fok Yuen-kap
 Yuen Yat-choh as young Fok Yuen-kap
 Yasuaki Kurata as Kong Ho-san
 Philip Ko as Fok Yan-tai
 Yuen Cheung-yan as pipe smoker
 Brandy Yuen as Bucktooth
 Steve Lee as Sanaka Jr.
 Lau Hok-nin as Fok's assistant
 Charlie Chan as Eagle Claw school representative
 Fong Yau as Sanaka Sr.
 Huang Ha as master defeated by Sanaka
 Fung Fung as boxing promoter
 Fung Hak-on as Bow Tie
 San Kuai as Shantung Yellow Tiger
 Lee Fat-yuen as Japanese swordsman
 Tai San
 Lau Fong-sai
 Hoh Tin-shing

External links

HKMDB
HK Cinemagic

1982 films
1982 martial arts films
1980s biographical films
1980s Cantonese-language films
Films directed by Yuen Woo-ping
Hong Kong biographical films
Hong Kong martial arts films
Kung fu films
Wushu films
1980s Hong Kong films